Lise Baastrup Nielsen (born 20 March 1984) is a Danish actress best known for starring in the TV series Rita, as well as the title role in the television mini-series Hjørdis.

She was nominated for two Best Supporting Actress Awards. in 2011, Baastrup debuted in the dramedy television series Lykke (2011 - 2012). Lise Baastrup is a graduate of Acting at Aarhus Theatre in 2010. After roles at Aarhus Theatre and Grønnegårdsteatret in Copenhagen, she was permanently employed at Aalborg Teater. She got her first major role on television in the series "Rita".

Filmography

References

External links

Lise Baastrup at the Danish Actors Association

1984 births
Living people
21st-century Danish actresses
Danish film actresses
Danish television actresses